Pseudoomphalina kalchbrenneri is a species of fungi in the family Tricholomataceae, and the type species of the genus Pseudoomphalina. Originally described as Omphalia kalchbrenneri by Italian mycologist Giacomo Bresadola, the species was made the type species of the then newly created genus Pseudoomphalina by Rolf Singer in 1958. The fungus is found in North America and Europe.

References

External links

Images

Tricholomataceae
Fungi described in 1881
Fungi of Europe
Fungi of North America